Secundio Fernández Felgueroso was a Spanish footballer who played as a forward for Athletic Club de Madrid and Racing de Santander in the late 1910s. The dates of his birth and death are unknown.

Biography
Born in Asturias, he played with Athletic Madrid for just one season in 1915–16, and at the end of the season, he signed for Racing de Santander, during which time he was summoned to play for the Cantabric national team in the 1917 Prince of Asturias Cup, an inter-regional competition organized by the RFEF. In the tournament, he played alongside Manuel Argüelles and the Villaverde brothers, Fernando and Senén, and scored one goal in a 2–3 loss to the Centro team (a Castile/Madrid XI).

References

Year of birth missing
Year of death missing
Footballers from Asturias
Spanish footballers
Association football forwards
Atlético Madrid footballers